Valea Bradului may refer to several villages in Romania:

 Valea Bradului, a village in Mihăeşti Commune, Argeș County
 Valea Bradului, a village in Brad city, Hunedoara County
 Valea Bradului, a village in Provița de Sus Commune, Prahova County